Cardiff South was a borough constituency in Cardiff, Wales.  It returned one Member of Parliament to the House of Commons of the Parliament of the United Kingdom.

The constituency was created for the 1918 general election, and abolished for the 1950 general election. Its final MP was Labour's James Callaghan, elected in 1945 at the age of 33, who would go on to serve the party until 1987, including a spell as prime minister from 1976 to 1979 after several roles in the governments of Harold Wilson.

Boundaries 
The County Borough of Cardiff wards of Adamsdown, Grangetown, and South, and the Urban District of Penarth.

Members of Parliament

Election results

Elections in the 1910s

Elections in the 1920s

Elections in the 1930s 

General Election 1939–40:
Another General Election was required to take place before the end of 1940. The political parties had been making preparations for an election to take place and by the Autumn of 1939, the following candidates had been selected; 
Conservative: Henry Arthur Evans
Labour: Sir William Allen Jowitt

Elections in the 1940s

References 

Politics of Cardiff
History of Glamorgan
Historic parliamentary constituencies in South Wales
Constituencies of the Parliament of the United Kingdom established in 1918
Constituencies of the Parliament of the United Kingdom disestablished in 1950